is a Japanese video game company which created what is widely credited as the first modern rhythm game, PaRappa the Rapper. It was founded by Masaya Matsuura in 1993. The game's success resulted a spin-off called Um Jammer Lammy, which is based on guitar samples, and eventually a proper sequel, PaRappa the Rapper 2. NanaOn-Sha also produced another music video game, Vib-Ribbon, but released the game only in Japan and the PAL region. The game was later released in North America on the PSN store as a PS1 classic in 2014.

The title of its company is Japanese for the number seven, sounds and the word company.

Games

References

External links
Official website

Video game companies established in 1993
Video game companies of Japan
Video game development companies
Japanese companies established in 1993